Gyula Földesi (born August 27, 1983) is a Hungarian politician, member of the National Assembly (MP) for Pesterzsébet (Budapest Constituency XXIX) between 2010 and 2014. He was a member of the Committee on Consumer Protection from May 14, 2010 to May 5, 2014.

Földesi was elected one of the recorders of the National Assembly of Hungary on May 14, 2010.

References

1983 births
Living people
Fidesz politicians
Members of the National Assembly of Hungary (2010–2014)
Members of the National Assembly of Hungary (2022–2026)
Politicians from Budapest